Norman Heaton Fisher (8 March 1916 – 12 February 1991) was a New Zealand boxer. He competed as a lightweight in the 1936 Summer Olympics, where he was eliminated in his first bout.

1936 Olympic results
Below is the record of Norman Fisher, a New Zealand lightweight boxer who competed at the 1936 Berlin Olympics:

 Round of 32: bye
 Round of 16:  lost to Lidoro Oliver (Argentina) by decision

In 1938 he turned professional and retired in 1944 after compiling a career record of six wins and three losses. In 1940 he attempted to win the New Zealand Welterweight Title, but lost by knockout.

References

1916 births
1991 deaths
Lightweight boxers
Olympic boxers of New Zealand
Boxers at the 1936 Summer Olympics
New Zealand male boxers